Pegsdon is a hamlet located in the Central Bedfordshire district of Bedfordshire, England. It is part of the Shillington civil parish, and is almost encircled by the county border with Hertfordshire.

Pegsdon Hills are located south and east of Pegsdon. They form the north-eastern end of the Chiltern Hills, and are managed as a nature reserve by the Wildlife Trust for Bedfordshire, Cambridgeshire and Northamptonshire. They adjoin Deacon Hill, and Deacon Hill and half of Pegsdon Hills are designated a Site of Special Scientific Interest.

Knocking Hoe is accessed by a footpath from Hitchin Road.  It is a national nature reserve  and a Site of Special Scientific Interest.

References

Hamlets in Bedfordshire
Central Bedfordshire District